The  Greenland Centre  is a residential skyscraper in Sydney, New South Wales, Australia, located on the corner of Bathurst and Pitt Street.

Construction 
The project was developed by Greenland Group and was designed by BVN and Woods Bagot. The initial stages of the project involved the gutting and conversion of the Sydney Water Board tower which previously occupied the site, before progressing to the construction of further storeys on top, resulting in a residential tower with 470 apartments and six penthouses across 67 levels. The adjoining heritage-listed, Art Deco style former Metropolitan Water Sewerage and Drainage Board building was converted into the Primus Hotel, a boutique 180-bed, five-star hotel as part of the same project. The Primus Hotel is part of a hotel chain owned by the municipal government of Shanghai. 

Demolition on the site began in early 2015, and construction on the main tower began in 2017. Initially, the hotel was expected to open in 2016 and the residential tower in 2019. However due to significant delays in construction, the opening of the tower was delayed to 2021. The tower topped out in July 2020, and was completed in March 2021.

Any reference to the number four is avoided in the building because "four" and "death" have a similar pronunciation in Mandarin Chinese. Consequently, the tower will have a level 83, but there will only be 68 floors with no levels 4, 14, 24, 34, 40–49, 54, 64 or 74.

Gallery

References

External links 
 
 CBRE Residential Projects Australia

Proposed skyscrapers in Australia
Skyscrapers in Sydney
Residential skyscrapers in Australia
Art Deco architecture in Sydney
Apartment buildings in Sydney
Proposed hotels
Skyscraper hotels in Australia